The Small Business Connection Championship was a golf tournament on the Web.com Tour. It was played for the first time as the Chiquita Classic in July 2010 at TPC River's Bend in Cincinnati, Ohio. Tommy Gainey won the inaugural event in 2010 by 3 strokes at 27-under-par.

From 2013 to 2015, it was part of the Web.com Tour Finals and the field consisted of the top 75 players from the Web.Com Tour money list and the players ranked 126 to 200 on the PGA Tour's money list at the start of the Finals. The tournament was moved to River Run Country Club in Davidson, North Carolina from 2013 onward and the purse was set at US$1,000,000, with $180,000 going to the winner.

Winners

Bolded golfers graduated to the PGA Tour via the final Web.com Tour money list, in the pre-Finals era. When the event was part of the Web.com Tour Finals, all winners and runners-up earned PGA Tour cards.

References

External links
Coverage on the Web.com Tour's official site

Former Korn Ferry Tour events
Golf in Ohio
Sports competitions in Cincinnati
Recurring sporting events established in 2010
2010 establishments in Ohio